Si Sauvage is an album released on both 12" vinyl and CD by the American New wave band The Suburbs, released in 2013. It was recorded 27 years after their last studio release.

Reception

Writing for Allmusic, music critic Mark Deming wrote of the album "It doesn't take long for Si Sauvage to announce itself as an album the Suburbs couldn't and wouldn't have made in the '80s, but if this is an older and battle-weary version of the Suburbs, it still sounds and feels like them... Si Sauvage is an album about acknowledging life's lessons without regrets, and finding both sorrow and joy in the process; it's the middle-aged response to the band's best album, 1984's Love Is the Law, and a work that gains depth and power with each listen."

Track listing
All songs composed by Blaine John "Beej" Chaney and Chan Poling.
"Born Under a Good Sign" – 4:03
"Turn the Radio On" – 4:14
"Dumb Ass Kids" – 3:10
"Where It Is!" – 4:05
"What's It Like out There?" – 4:05
"Reset the Party" – 3:12
"You've Got to Love Her" – 3:32
"I Liked It Better When You Loved Me" – 3:38
"Si Sauvage" – 3:12
"This Monkey" – 3:50

Personnel
 Chan Poling – vocals, keyboards
 Blaine John "Beej" Chaney – vocals
 Hugo Klaers – drums
 Steve Brantseg – guitar
 Steve Price – bass
 Max Ray – saxophone
 Rochelle Becker – baritone saxophone
 Stephen Kung – trumpet
 Janey Winterbauer – vocals
 Aby Wolf – vocals

Production notes
Steve Price – producer
Steve Nagel – assistant engineer
Chuck Zwicky – mixing, mastering
Kii Arens – artwork, photography

References

2013 albums
The Suburbs albums